USS SC-636 was a SC-497 class submarine chaser that served in the United States Navy during World War II.

It was laid down on 29 August 1941 by the Vineyard Shipbuilding Co. in Milford, Delaware and launched on 14 May 1942. It was commissioned on 11 July 1942. It foundered during Typhoon Louise on 9 October 1945 off the coast of Okinawa.

References
Submarine Chaser Photo Archive: SC-636
USS SC-636 (SC-636)
Splinter fleet stories

SC-497-class submarine chasers
Ships built in Milford, Delaware
1942 ships
Maritime incidents in October 1945
Shipwrecks in the Pacific Ocean